Sophia Handa is an Indian actress and model.  She is best known for winning the Gladrags Mrs.India 2009 competition, a competition for Indian married women.  She made her Bollywood debut in the 2010 Bollywood horror film, Help, which co-stars Bobby Deol and Mugdha Godse.

Gladrags Mrs. India 2009
In 2009, Handa won 1st place at the Gladrags Mrs. India 2009 competition.

Bollywood
Handa made her debut in the 2010 Bollywood horror, Help, directed by Rajeev Virani, in which she stars alongside Bobby Deol and Mugdha Godse. The film released on 13 August.

References

External links
 

Living people
Actresses from Mumbai
Year of birth missing (living people)
Actresses in Hindi cinema